Dalbergia bracteolata is a species of legume in the family Fabaceae.
It is found in Kenya, Madagascar, Mozambique, and Tanzania.
It is threatened by habitat loss.

References

bracteolata
Flora of Madagascar
Flora of Mozambique
Flora of Kenya
Flora of Tanzania
Near threatened plants
Taxonomy articles created by Polbot